State Road 605 (NM 605) is a  state highway in the US state of New Mexico. NM 605's southern terminus is at NM 122 in Milan, and the northern terminus is at the end of state maintenance in San Mateo.

Major intersections

See also

References

605
Transportation in Cibola County, New Mexico
Transportation in McKinley County, New Mexico